Skue Sparebank is a Norwegian savings bank, headquartered in Nesbyen, Norway. The banks main market is
Buskerud. The banks history goes back to 1842 with the establishment of Nes Prestegjelds Sparebank.

References

Banks of Norway
Companies based in Buskerud
Banks established in 1842
Companies listed on the Oslo Stock Exchange